Nagoya Mosque (Romaji: Nagoya Mosuku) is a mosque in Nakamura-ku, Nagoya, Aichi Prefecture, Japan.

In 1980s, Muslims around the area started to collect donations for construction and the mosque was built in 1998. In 2002, they acquired capacity of Religious corporation in the name of Islamic Center of Nagoya, and since then, they run the mosque. The organization also set up a mosque called Gifu Masjid in Gifu Prefecture in 2008.

They arranges certificates issuance and offers introductory booklets on Islam.

Prior to this, in this area, there was a mosque called Nagoya Muslim Mosque which has been burnt down during World War II.

See also
 Islam in Japan

References

1998 establishments in Japan
Mosques completed in 1998
Mosques in Japan
Religious buildings and structures in Nagoya